GUSA may refer to:

 Georgetown University Student Association, a student representative organisation at Georgetown University in Washington, D.C.
 Glasgow University Sports Association, a student sport organisation at the University of Glasgow, United Kingdom
 Sangarédi Airport, Guinea (by ICAO code)

See also
 Gusa